The peryton is a mythological hybrid animal combining the physical features of a stag and a bird. The peryton was first named by Jorge Luis Borges in his 1957 Book of Imaginary Beings, using a supposedly long-lost medieval manuscript as a source.

Mythology
The peryton is said to have the head, neck, forelegs and antlers of a stag, combined with the plumage, wings and hindquarters of a large bird, although some interpretations portray the peryton as a deer in all but coloration and bird's wings.

According to Borges, perytons lived in Atlantis until an earthquake destroyed the civilization and the creatures escaped by flight. A peryton casts the shadow of a man until it kills one during its lifetime, at which time it starts to cast its own shadow. A sibyl once prophesied that the perytons would lead to the downfall of Rome.

In Borges' original Spanish edition, the word is given as peritio so the presumptive Latin original would be peritius, which happens to be the Latin form of the Greek name of the fourth month on the ancient Macedonian calendar (Peritios, moon of January). The connection of this, if any, to the peryton is unclear. As at least one depiction of the Peryton - namely on the late medieval battle standard of the Dukes of Bourbon - pre-dates Borges' description, he clearly was not its inventor, though the creature's exact origins remain unclear.

In popular culture
Perytons are found or used in modern literature and games.

Books and manga
 The creatures appear in Darkwell, a book in The Moonshae Trilogy, where a flock of perytons are among an army of evil monsters summoned by the book's main antagonist.
 The peryton features in John and Carole Barrowman's novel Hollow Earth.
 Perytons appear in Across the Green Grass Fields, the 6th of the Wayward Children series by Seanan McGuire.

Games
Perytons have been adapted into Dungeons & Dragons, with it initially appearing in the 1st edition Monster Manual.

Science
 The term peryton is also used for radio signals of terrestrial origin that mimic fast radio bursts, pulses that appear to be coming from outside of our galaxy. These perytons were found to be the result of premature opening of a microwave oven door, which releases a frequency-swept radio pulse, which mimics a fast radio burst, as the magnetron turns off.

See also
 Hybrid (mythology)

References

Fantasy creatures
Mythological deer
Mythological hybrids
Fakelore